Won-ho is a Korean masculine given name. Its meaning differs based on the hanja used to write each syllable of the name. There are 35 hanja with the reading "won" and 49 hanja with the reading "ho" on the South Korean government's official list of hanja which may be registered for use in given names.

People with this name include:
Li Won-ho (born 1972), North Korean short track speed skater
Shin Won-ho (director) (born 1975), South Korean television producer and director
Wonny Song (Korean name Song Won-ho; born 1978), South Korean-born Canadian pianist
Wonho Chung (born 1980), South Korean comedian 
Shin Won-ho (born 1991), South Korean actor
Wonho (singer) (born Lee Ho-seok, 1993), South Korean solo singer, producer, ex-member of Monsta X
Kim Won-ho (born 1999), South Korean badminton player
Park Won-ho, executive chairman of DI Corporation, father of PSY

See also
List of Korean given names

References

Korean masculine given names